Carina Holmberg (born 4 October 1983) is a Swedish football player for Sunnanå SK in the Swedish Elitettan who is a forward. She has represented Sweden women's national football team at the senior international level.

She made her senior international debut in a 6–1 win over Iceland at the 2013 Algarve Cup on 8 March 2013. A succession of injuries caused Holmberg to drop out of national team contention before UEFA Women's Euro 2013.

Holmberg had joined Sunnanå SK from Bälinge IF ahead of the 2005 season.

References

External links
 Sweden player profile

Swedish women's footballers
1983 births
Living people
Sweden women's international footballers
Damallsvenskan players
Bälinge IF players
Sunnanå SK players
Women's association football forwards